Harvey "Skip" Millier is an American former ice dancer who competed with his sister Anne Millier.

Results
(with Millier)

References

American male ice dancers
Living people
Year of birth missing (living people)